Doddapaneni Kalyankrishna is an Indian first-class cricketer from Vijayawada, Andhra Pradesh. He plays for Andhra cricket team. Kalyankrishna was part of the Deccan Chargers roster for the IPL season of 2007–2008.

References 

Indian cricketers
Andhra cricketers
South Zone cricketers
Deccan Chargers cricketers
Living people
1983 births
Cricketers from Vijayawada